Julie Kathleen Gutz (December 4, 1926 – April 26, 2021) was an American baseball catcher who played in the All-American Girls Professional Baseball League. Listed at 5' 5", 155 lb., Gutz batted and threw right handed. She was dubbed 'Gutzie' by her teammates.

Born in Storm Lake, Iowa, Julie Gutz caught for three seasons from 1948 through 1950, starting with the Springfield Sallies and Muskegon Lassies before ending her career with the Kenosha Comets.

While she was a light-hitting catcher, Gutz provided solid defense with a strong throwing arm and showed notable durability. During one stretch, she caught in 110 consecutive games and never missed an inning. Her most productive season came in 1950, when she hit .203 in 112 games.

In a 235-game career, Gutz posted an average of .175 (124-for-709) with 13 doubles, five triples and one home run, stealing 14 bases and scoring 62 runs while driving in another 44.

As a catcher, she recorded 846 putouts with 238 assists  and turned 20 double plays, committing 55 errors in 1,139 total chances for a .952 fielding average.

Afterwards, Gutz worked as an electronics technician at Honeywell and later managed a resort in Kabetogama, Minnesota.

In 1988 was unveiled a permanent display at the Baseball Hall of Fame and Museum at Cooperstown, New York, that honors those who were part of the All-American Girls Professional Baseball League. Julie Gutz is included at the display/exhibit. Gutz would consult on the 1992 film A League of Their Own, which was about the AAGPBL.

Gutz died in Murrieta, California in April 2021, at the age of 94.

Career statistics
Batting

Fielding

References

1926 births
2021 deaths
All-American Girls Professional Baseball League players
Springfield Sallies players
Muskegon Lassies players
Kenosha Comets players
Baseball players from Iowa
People from Storm Lake, Iowa
21st-century American women